Monica Anghel (born 1 June 1971 in Bucharest, Romania) is a Romanian singer and television personality. In 1996, she took part in the international preselection for the Eurovision Song Contest. The Romanian song "Rugă pentru pacea lumii" was not chosen to go to the international final in Oslo. In the same year, she won the "Golden Stag Festival" for Romania.

Anghel participated in the Eurovision Song Contest 2002 in Tallinn, with Marcel Pavel. Their song "Tell Me Why" reached the 9th place, which was the third best score ever for Romania. A few years later Anghel started to collaborate with comic group Divertis.

In 2003 and 2017, Walt Disney Pictures chose the Romanian pop star to provide the Romanian voice for one of the muses from the animated movie Hercules.

See also
Music of Romania

References

1971 births
Living people
21st-century Romanian singers
21st-century Romanian women singers
Eurovision Song Contest entrants of 1996
Eurovision Song Contest entrants of 2002
Eurovision Song Contest entrants for Romania
Golden Stag winners